Atkinson and Gilmanton Academy Grant is a township in Coös County, New Hampshire, United States. It was later expanded by annexation of previously ungranted land to the west. The population was zero as of the 2020 census. It is part of the Berlin, NH–VT Micropolitan Statistical Area.

In New Hampshire, locations, grants, townships (which are different from towns), and purchases are unincorporated portions of a county which are not part of any town and have limited self-government (if any, as many are uninhabited).

Atkinson and Gilmanton Academy Grant will fall within the path of totality during the solar eclipse of April 8, 2024.

Geography
The township is drained by the Dead Diamond River and its branches, except for the eastern edge of the township, which is drained by Abbott Brook. Both waterways are tributaries of the Magalloway River and part of the Androscoggin River watershed. The township is bordered to the east by the state of Maine.

The grant boundaries shown in 1874 maps differ from those of 1850s maps by showing a parcel of ungranted "state land" on the western edge of this grant (and north of Dix's Grant), and another "Dartmouth College Grant" to the west of that (later annexed to the eastern edge of Clarksville).

Demographics

As of the 2020 census, there were no people living in the township.

References

Townships in Coös County, New Hampshire
Berlin, New Hampshire micropolitan area
Townships in New Hampshire